General Sir Frederick William Trench  (17756 December 1859), was a British Army officer and Tory politician.

Family background
Trench was the son of Michael Frederick Trench, a barrister and amateur architect, of Heywood, only son of Reverend Frederick Trench, of Ballinakill, in Queen's County (now County Laois). His mother was Anne Helena, daughter and heiress of Patrick Stewart, second son of James Stewart, of Killymoon, County Tyrone. The Earls of Clancarty were members of another branch of the Trench family.

Military career
He was commissioned as an ensign and lieutenant in the 1st Foot Guards then promoted to lieutenant and captain on 12November 1807. Trench served on the quartermaster's staff in Sicily in 1806-7 and was part of the disastrous 1809 Walcheren Expedition. He was sent to Cádiz in 1811 during the Peninsular War until on 1August he was promoted to major and appointed assistant quartermaster-general in the Kent district. After his appoint as deputy quartermaster-general to the corps on 25November 1813, he accompanied General Sir Thomas Graham to Holland in 1814 as a lieutenant-colonel. In 1814 he was placed on half-pay and became an aide-de-camp to the King on 27May 1825. Under the Wellington ministry he was appointed Storekeeper of the Ordnance in 1829, a post he held until 1831. He was promoted to general in 1846.

Political career
He sat as a Member of Parliament (MP) for Mitchell between 1806 and 1807, for Dundalk between February and October 1812, for Cambridge between 1819 and 1832 and for Scarborough between 1835 and 1847.

Trench also proposed several "improvement schemes" in London, most notably The Embankment (conceived to relieve traffic on the Strand and provide a pleasant riverside walk) but this was not completed until five years after he died in Brighton on 6December 1859.

References

Attribution

External links

1859 deaths
British Army generals
Irish Conservative Party MPs
Conservative Party (UK) MPs for English constituencies
Members of the Parliament of the United Kingdom for County Louth constituencies (1801–1922)
Tory MPs (pre-1834)
UK MPs 1806–1807
UK MPs 1812–1818
UK MPs 1818–1820
UK MPs 1820–1826
UK MPs 1826–1830
UK MPs 1830–1831
UK MPs 1831–1832
UK MPs 1835–1837
UK MPs 1837–1841
UK MPs 1841–1847
Members of the Parliament of the United Kingdom for constituencies in Cornwall
1775 births
Frederick